The 1953 Pro Bowl was the NFL's third annual all-star game which featured the league's outstanding performers from the 1952 season. The game was played on January 10, 1953, at the Los Angeles Memorial Coliseum in Los Angeles, California in front of 34,208 fans. The National Conference squad defeated the American Conference by a score of 27–7.

The National team was led by the Detroit Lions' Buddy Parker while Paul Brown of the Cleveland Browns coached the American stars. Detroit Lions defensive halfback Don Doll was named the game's outstanding player.

References

External links

Pro Bowl
Pro Bowl
Pro Bowl
Pro Bowl
1953 in Los Angeles
National Football League in Los Angeles
January 1953 sports events in the United States